Terry Charles "Bud" Bulling (December 15, 1952 – March 8, 2014) was a Major League Baseball catcher for the Minnesota Twins and Seattle Mariners (–).

In 1974, while playing for the Wisconsin Rapids Twins, Bulling was accidentally shot in the abdomen by a teammate. The bullet lodged in his pelvic bone and he spent three days in intensive care.

In , Bulling caught Gaylord Perry's 300th win.

Bulling died on March 8, 2014.

References

External links

1952 births
2014 deaths
Baseball players from California
Major League Baseball catchers
Minnesota Twins players
Orlando Twins players
People from Lynwood, California
Salt Lake City Gulls players
Seattle Mariners players
Spokane Indians players
Wisconsin Rapids Twins players
Anchorage Glacier Pilots players
Cal State Los Angeles Golden Eagles baseball players
American shooting survivors
Golden West Rustlers baseball players